One Flight Up is an album by American jazz saxophonist Dexter Gordon recorded in 1964 in Paris and released on the Blue Note label., featuring Donald Byrd on trumpet, pianist Kenny Drew, bassist Niels-Henning Ørsted Pedersen, and drummer Art Taylor.

Reception
The Allmusic review by Michael G. Nastos awarded the album 3½ stars stating "One Flight Up stands as a testament to Dexter Gordon's viability as a bandleader and teammate, while his individualism is somewhat sublimated. It's a good listen to digest all the way through, especially if you are as patient as the performers, who have a lot to say".

The LondonJazzCollector remarks upon Gordon's role in encouraging young talent and seasoned pros alike to stretch themselves, stating "it’s great to find [Gordon] give lots of space to the other players, particularly in the Byrd-penned “Tanya” which  occupies all of side one. Dexter is quietly restrained, Byrd plays to Hubbard, Drew plays to Pearson and Hancock, Taylor mixes Blakey with a touch of Williams, and NHOP [Pedersen] walks dreamlike through the 18 minute space."

Track listing
All compositions by Dexter Gordon except as indicated.

 "Tanya" (Donald Byrd) - 18:18
 "Coppin' the Haven" (Kenny Drew) - 11:17
 "Darn That Dream" (Eddie DeLange, Jimmy Van Heusen) - 7:30
 "Kong Neptune" - 11:02 Bonus track on CD reissue

Personnel
Dexter Gordon - tenor saxophone
Donald Byrd - trumpet (tracks 1 & 2)
Kenny Drew - piano
Niels-Henning Ørsted Pedersen - bass
Art Taylor - drums

References

Blue Note Records albums
Dexter Gordon albums
1965 albums